Daan Brandenburg (born November 14, 1987) is a Dutch chess grandmaster.

Chess career
Born in 1987, Brandenburg became an International Master in 2007 and earned the Grandmaster title in 2011. He is the No. 28 ranked Dutch player as of June 2018.

Personal life
In 2014, he began taking classes in the master's degree program in multilingualism at the University of Groningen's Leeuwarden campus.

References

External links

1987 births
Dutch chess players
Chess grandmasters
Living people
People from Lelystad
University of Groningen alumni
Sportspeople from Flevoland